Jonathan William Katchen (born August 12, 1975) is an American lawyer who is of counsel in the Anchorage office of Holland & Hart. In 2018, he was nominated by President Donald Trump to become a United States district judge of the United States District Court for the District of Alaska, but Katchen withdrew his name for consideration.

Education 

Katchen earned his Bachelor of Arts degree in theology, cum laude, from Boston College in 1998. He received his Master of Arts degree in theology in 2001, also from Boston College. Katchen received his Juris Doctor from the University of California, Hastings College of the Law.

Legal career 

After graduating from law school in 2004, Katchen clerked for Judge Maryanne Trump Barry of the United States Court of Appeals for the Third Circuit. From 2010 to 2012, Katchen was the intergovernmental coordinator for the Alaska Department of Natural Resources, where he led the agency's administrative appeals and litigation, and provided counsel to Commissioner Dan Sullivan. He also worked in the Alaska Attorney General's office, where he was an assistant in the oil, gas, and mining department. From 2012 to 2017, he worked at Crowell & Moring. Katchen currently practices at Holland & Hart, where he works in commercial and natural resources litigation, including oil and gas law.

Failed nomination to federal district court 

On April 10, 2018, President Trump announced his intent to nominate Katchen to serve as a United States District Judge of the United States District Court for the District of Alaska. On April 12, 2018, his nomination was sent to the Senate. He was nominated to the seat vacated by Judge Ralph Beistline, who assumed senior status on December 31, 2015. His nomination was referred to the Senate Judiciary Committee. In August 2018, Katchen withdrew his name from consideration, citing the uncertainty of the nomination process and timing.

See also 
 Donald Trump judicial appointment controversies

References 

1975 births
Living people
21st-century American lawyers
Alaska lawyers
Boston College School of Theology and Ministry alumni
People from Livingston, New Jersey
University of California, Hastings College of the Law alumni